Stenolechia kodamai is a moth of the family Gelechiidae. It is found in Japan (Honshu) and Korea (Yeonpyeongdo and Decheongdo).

The wingspan is about 8 mm. Adults are similar to Stenolechia bathrodyas, but lack the yellow scales on the forewings.

The larvae feed on Pinus densiflora. They mine the leaves of their host plant.

References

Moths described in 1962
Stenolechia